Quest USA, Da Tiao Zhan (美国大挑战) 2005 was America's first Chinese-language reality TV show (真人秀). 11 episodes were hosted by David Wu.

References

External links 
QuestUSA.tv

2005 American television series debuts
2006 American television series endings
2000s American reality television series